Glen Gower (born 1978) is a Canadian politician. He was elected to Ottawa City Council representing Stittsville Ward in the 2018 Ottawa municipal election.

Gower grew up in the neighbourhood of Tanglewood in Nepean, Ontario, now part of Ottawa. He attended Merivale High School, where he helped start a school newspaper. He received a bachelor's degree in journalism from Carleton University. While at Carleton, he started a website to track gas prices in Ottawa, which would later be bought out by GasBuddy. Later, he would start the website OttawaStart.com. He moved to Stittsville in 2009. After moving there, he helped create a community association for the neighbourhood. Prior to being elected, he was the director of Marketing and Communications with Iceberg Networks. He has also worked in marketing and communications with the Ottawa 67's and Ottawa Senators hockey teams, where he was also the organist. He served as the director of game presentation for the Senators until 2013.

Ideologically, Gower has been described as a "moderate", and has stated that he has "voted for every political party". He is an admirer of former Prime Minister John Diefenbaker, whom he calls a "social trailblazer". One of his websites he created in his youth was dedicated to Diefenbaker.

Gower won election to city council in 2018, campaigning on "healthier development". He defeated three-term incumbent Shad Qadri with 58% of the vote to Qadri's 42%.

References

Living people
1978 births
Ottawa city councillors
Carleton University alumni
Male organists
Canadian organists
Canadian male journalists
Journalists from Ontario
Ottawa Senators personnel